The Ben Hogan Quicksilver Open was a golf tournament on the Ben Hogan Tour. It ran from 1990 to 1992, during which time it was the richest event on the tour. It was played at Quicksilver Golf Club in the Pittsburgh suburb of Midway, Pennsylvania.

In 1992 the winner earned $50,000.

Winners

References

Former Korn Ferry Tour events
Golf in Pennsylvania
Recurring sporting events established in 1990
Recurring sporting events disestablished in 1992
1990 establishments in Pennsylvania
1992 disestablishments in Pennsylvania